The following is the list of cities in Georgia that underwent a name change in the past.

Tetritsq'aro → Aghbulakhi → Tetritsq'aro (1940)
Baghdati → Maiakovski (1940) → Baghdati (1990)
Tsalka → Barmaksizi → Tsalka (1932)
Dbanisi → Bashkicheti → Dmanisi (1947)
Ninotsminda → Altunkale → Bogdanovka (1829) → Ninotsminda (1991)
Dioscurias → Savastapolis → Tskhumi → Sohumkale → Sukhumi
Elisabethtal → Asureti (1943)
Chqondidi → Martvili → Gegechkori (1936) → Martvili (1990) 
Kvirila → Jugeli (1920) → Zestafoni (1921)
Gardabani → Karaiazi → Gardabani (1947)
Khashuri → Mikhailovo (1872) → Khashuri (1918) → Stalinisi (1931) → Khashuri (1934)
Bolnisi → Chörük-Qamarli → Katarinenfeld (1817) → Lüksemburgi (1921) → Bolnisi (1943)
Stepantsminda → Kazbegi → Stepantsminda (2006) 
Akhalgori → Leningori (1935) → Akhalgori (1991)
Ozurgeti → Makharadze (1922) → Ozurgeti (1990) 
Kharagauli → Orjonikidze → Kharagauli (1990) 
Marneuli → Sarvan → Borchalo (1929) → Marneuli (1947)
Senaki → Mikha-Tskhakaia (1935) → Tskhakaia (1976) → Senaki (1989)
Shulavery → Shahumiani (1925) → Shulaveri (1991)
Trialeti → Molotovo (1940) → Trialeti (1957)
Dedoplistskaro → Tsarskiye Kolodtsy (1803) → Tsitelitskaro (1921) → Dedoplistsq'aro (1991)
Tskhinvali → Staliniri (1934) → Tskhinvali (1961)
Khoni → Tsulukidze (1936) → Khoni (1990)
Tiflis → Tbilisi (1936)

Source
 Georgian Soviet Encyclopedia, Volumes 2, 3, 4, 6, 7, 10, 11; Tbilisi, 1977/1987
 ქართლის ცხოვრების ტოპოარქეოლოგიური ლექსიკონი (Topoarcheological lexicon of Kartlis Tskhovreba), Tbilisi, 2013

See also
List of places named after Stalin
List of renamed cities in Armenia
List of renamed cities in Azerbaijan

 
Georgia, Renamed
Georgia (country) geography-related lists
Georgia